Darien Ferrer Delis (also spelled Darienn, born 31 October 1982) is a volleyball player from Cuba, who plays as a middle-blocker for the men's national team. He ended up in second place at the first 2008 Olympic Qualification Tournament in Düsseldorf, where Cuba missed qualification for the 2008 Summer Olympics in Beijing, PR China. On club level he played for Santiago de Cuba.

Honours
 2007 America's Cup — 3rd place
 2008 Olympic Qualification Tournament — 2nd place (did not qualify)

Notes

References

External links
 Darien Ferrer at FIVB Men's World Olympic Qualification Tournament 2008
 Darienn Ferrer Delis at FIVB World League 2009
 
 

1982 births
Living people
Cuban men's volleyball players
Sportspeople from Santiago de Cuba
Olympic volleyball players of Cuba
Volleyball players at the 2016 Summer Olympics